The High Park fire was a wildfire in the mountains west of Fort Collins in Larimer County, Colorado, United States. It was caused by a lightning strike and was first detected on the morning of June 9, 2012.  It was declared 100 percent contained on June 30, 2012, and all associated evacuation orders were lifted.  Disambiguation.  In 2022 there was another fire called "High Park Fire."  That fire started on 05/12/2022 6 miles west of Cripple Creek Colorado.  The size at 89% containment (last report) was 1,572 acres.  Since wildland fire names are typically assigned by personnel on the fire and often based on local knowledge, it is not unusual to have more than one fire with the same name.

A 62-year-old woman was killed in the fire.
  
On the evening of August 18, 2020 the Pine Gulch Fire in Mesa and Garfield Counties grew to 125,108 acres overnight surpassing the High Park fire. It destroyed at least 259 homes, compared to the Black Forest Fire with a number of 511 homes, surpassing the number consumed by the 2010 Fourmile Canyon fire. The High Park fire became the third most destructive fire in Colorado history, in terms of the number of houses burned, but was surpassed about a week later by the Waldo Canyon fire.

Development
The High Park Fire was caused by lightning (the strike tree was located) and started in a difficult to access area above the Buckhorn Road in Larimer County Colorado.  The fire was reported as a smoke column early in the morning on June 9, 2012.  The area had been suffering from hot and dry conditions and fire danger was extreme.  Multiple agencies responded for the initial attack, including http://www.rcvfd.org Rist Canyon Volunteer Fire Department (the fire started in RCVFD's area), Larimer County Emergency Services, Poudre Fire Authority, Poudre Canyon Fire Protection District, Colorado State Forest Service, USFS, and other local agencies.  A SEAT (Single Engine Air Tanker) and helicopter were ordered immediately.  The ignition point and foot of the fire was accessible only via 4wd road that would support apparatus no larger than Type 6x NWCG Engine Standards.  The fire was named High Park as this is the local name for the area it burned.

Due to extreme burning conditions, poor access and rapid fire-spread, it became quickly clear the fire would impact multiple residential areas and evacuations were called for an increasing area through the day. Areas evacuated included Buckhorn Canyon, Paradise Parke, Stove Prairie, Flower Road, Rist Canyon, Paradise Park, Poudre Park, Poudre Canyon, Davis Ranch, Whale Rock, Pine Acres and other areas.  The evacuation lasted nearly 21 days –– much longer than other large Colorado fires.  Evacuation was conducted via reverse 911 calls, then by door-to-door visits by Fire Department and Law Enforcement. Since the area was served by overhead power and phone lines, power and phone were lost very rapidly.  Furthermore, the area was not served by cellular service.  These factors, plus damage to basic infrastructure, were key limiters in re-patriation. Residents would be returning to very dangerous conditions and with no effective communications.

High Park Fire burned aggressively and with high intensity for days.  This fire did not burn through and settle down, but continued to burn actively.  Two weeks into the fire it was still burning so aggressively that over 50 homes were lost as the fire burned into a subdivision north of the Poudre River.  This was despite days of preparatory efforts, and demonstrates the power of fire in the wildland/urban interface.

While loss of so many homes in the High Park fire is certainly a tragic loss, response to the High Park fire is recognized as a model good response.  Agencies in the area have a long cooperative history with established and recognized ability to work together to a common goal regardless of agency boundaries. Fire and local agency responses were effective and well-coordinated. Furthermore, years (decades) of active work with residents to prepare for fire was effective.  Many houses survived due to efforts made by landowners that allowed their homes to survive the fire front and gave fire fighters the benefit of time in defending and saving structures. That said, it was a daily battle that extended to weeks to save some homes.  Critical to that success was the thorough mapping and preparation done by local fire departments which allowed incoming fire fighters to be more effective, more rapidly.

However, further work on making homes in the urban interface ignition resistant is needed.  This was a major topic at the NFPA Backyards and Beyond conference held in Salt Lake City in 2013.

Impact of 2013 Floods
One of the key factors that residents must be prepared for after a major fire is flooding.  According to the High Park Burned Area Emergency Response (BAER) Report  the High Park area could expect water flows in streams to be 5 to 10x pre fire levels for any given rainfall.  Also predicted was major flooding in the case of a significant rain event.  For this reason, residents in High Park as well as Larimer County prepared extensively for flooding.  Larimer County upgraded culverts in the Rist Canyon to heavy concrete structures with concrete debris wings that would prevent debris capture and subsequent blockage of the culverts.  As predicted, during the spring and summer of 2013, Rist Canyon Road, Stove Prairie Road, and Buckhorn Canyon Road, as well as the Poudre Canyon, experienced multiple flood events.  However, due to the preparation, the impact of the events was minimized.

This culminated in the major rain/flood event of September 2013 when, over the period of just a couple of days, the front range of Colorado received extremely heavy and persistent rain.  Rain gauges in Rist Canyon recorded over 15" of rain.  Due to the extra preparation post High Park, the Rist Canyon Road remained relatively intact.  While many of the new culvert structures overtopped (as designed), they did not plug or fail and the road remained.  Neighboring roads that had not received the same preparation were destroyed.  For example, the Buckhorn Canyon Road - used to access the High Park Ignition point - was destroyed.  Helicopter flights after the flood showed that, in many places, all signs of the road were gone. 

Ultimately, due to the flood preparations by residents and agencies after High Park, that area weathered the floods of 2013 relatively well.  By December 2013 all major roads in the area had received effective, if temporary, repairs, and residents who had been cut off were told they could now access their properties.

See also
 2012 Colorado wildfires

References

External links 

 Colorado Department of Public Health and Environment Front Range Air Quality Forecast & Colorado Smoke Outlook

Wildfires in Colorado
2012 wildfires in the United States
2012 in Colorado
June 2012 events in the United States